Ricardo Abumohor (born 9 June 1942) is a Chilean businessman of Palestinian origin, current owner of Primera División club O'Higgins since 2006. He also was the president of the Anfp five years, in where the Chile national team during his period qualified to the 1998 FIFA World Cup held in France thanks to the coach Nelson Acosta.

O'Higgins

First term

Abumohor bought the team to Codelco, having the Primera B title as principal objective for return to the Primera División, achieving also that objective, defeating 4–3 to Deportes Melipilla in the aggregate for the promotion with Hugo Brizuela and Mario Núñez as the key players of the success.

The titles

In 2012 Apertura, was runner-up with O'Higgins, after lose the final against Universidad de Chile in the penalty shoot-out.

In 2013, he won the Apertura 2013–14 with O'Higgins, being the first title in the history of the club, receiving with the coach Eduardo Berizzo the Llaves de la Ciudad de Rancagua by the Rancagua's alcalde Eduardo Soto. In 2014, he won the Supercopa de Chile against Deportes Iquique in the penalty shoot-out.

The club participated in the 2014 Copa Libertadores where they faced Deportivo Cali, Cerro Porteño and Lanús, being third and being eliminated in the group stage.

Honours

Club
O'Higgins
Primera División: Apertura 2013–14
Supercopa de Chile: 2014

Individual

O'Higgins
Llaves de la Ciudad de Rancagua: 2014

References

External links

 

O'Higgins F.C.
1942 births
Living people
Chilean people of Palestinian descent
People from Santiago
Presidents of the ANFP